Campbells Creek is a tributary of the Kanawha River,  long, in West Virginia in the United States.

Campbells Creek flows for its entire length in Kanawha County. The creek is paralleled by county roads for most of its course.

The Geographic Names Information System lists "Campbell Creek," "Campbell's Creek," and "Nip-pi-pin-mah" as historical variant names for the creek.

See also
List of rivers of West Virginia

References 

Rivers of West Virginia
Rivers of Kanawha County, West Virginia
Tributaries of the Kanawha River